Nikolai Ivanovich Vavilov  (– 26 January 1943) was a Russian and Soviet agronomist, botanist and geneticist who identified the centers of origin of cultivated plants. He devoted his life to the study and improvement of wheat, maize and other cereal crops that sustain the global population.

Vavilov's work was criticized by Trofim Lysenko, whose anti-Mendelian concepts of plant biology had won favor with Joseph Stalin. As a result, Vavilov was arrested and subsequently sentenced to death in July 1941. Although his sentence was commuted to twenty years' imprisonment, he died in prison in 1943. In 1955 his death sentence was retroactively pardoned under Nikita Khrushchev. By the 1960s his reputation was publicly rehabilitated and he began to be hailed as a hero of Soviet science.

Early years and education

Vavilov was born into a merchant family in Moscow, the older brother of physicist Sergey Ivanovich Vavilov. Despite his strict upbringing in the Orthodox Church, he was an atheist.

His father had grown up in poverty due to recurring crop failures and food rationing, and Vavilov became obsessed from an early age with ending famine.

Vavilov entered the Petrovskaya Agricultural Academy (now the Russian State Agrarian University – Moscow Timiryazev Agricultural Academy) in 1906. During this time he became known for carrying a pet lizard in his pocket wherever he went. He graduated from the Petrovka in 1910 with a dissertation on snails as pests. From 1911 to 1912, he worked at the Bureau for Applied Botany and at the Bureau of Mycology and Phytopathology. From 1913 to 1914 he travelled in Europe and studied plant immunity, in collaboration with the British biologist William Bateson, who helped establish the science of genetics.

Academic career
From 1917 to 1920, he was a professor at the Faculty of Agronomy, University of Saratov. From 1924 to 1935 he was the director of the Lenin All-Union Academy of Agricultural Sciences at Leningrad. Impressed with the work of Canadian phytopathologist Margaret Newton on wheat stem rust, in 1930 he attempted to hire her to work at the institute, offering a good salary and perks such as a camel caravan for her travel. She declined, but visited the institute in 1933 for three months to train 50 students in her research.

While developing his theory on the centers of origin of cultivated plants, Vavilov organized a series of botanical-agronomic expeditions and collected seeds from every corner of the globe. In 1927, he presented the centers of origin to the public on the Fifth International Congress of Genetics in Berlin (V. Internationaler Kongress für Vererbungswissenschaft Berlin). In Leningrad, he created the world's largest collection of plant seeds.  Vavilov also formulated the law of homologous series in variation. He was a member of the USSR Central Executive Committee, President of All-Union Geographical Society, and a recipient of the Lenin Prize.

Political eclipse and persecution
In 1932, during the sixth congress, Vavilov proposed holding the seventh International Congress of Genetics in the USSR. After some initial resistance by the organizing committee, in 1935 it agreed to hold the seventh congress in Moscow in 1937. The Presidium of the USSR Academy of Sciences decided to support the idea and asked the Communist Party for its approval, which it gave on 31 July 1935. Vavilov was elected chairman of the International Congress of Genetics. 

However, on 14 November 1936 the Politburo decided to cancel the congress. The seventh International Congress of Genetics was postponed until 1939 and took place in Edinburgh instead. The Politburo prohibited Vavilov from travelling abroad; during the Congress's opening ceremony an empty chair was placed on the stage as a symbolic reminder of Vavilov's involuntary absence.

 
Vavilov encountered the young Trofim Lysenko and at first encouraged Lysenko's work. However, Vavilov changed his mind and became an outspoken critic of Lysenko, because Lysenko did not believe in genetics and Vavilov feared that Lysenko's ideas could be disastrous for Soviet agriculture. Vavilov publicly criticized Lysenko both at home and while on foreign trips. 

However, Stalin believed in Lysenko's theories and, as a result, so did the rest of the Soviet government. The Soviet authorities suspected that Vavilov was trying to sabotage Soviet agriculture with bad science, and their suspicions were aggravated by his associations with other scientists who had been convicted of espionage, some of whom falsely implicated Vavilov in counter-revolutionary activities. 

As a result, Vavilov was arrested on 6 August 1940 while on an expedition to Ukraine. The warrant for Vavilov's arrest was issued by 1st Lt. Vladimir Ruzin of the NKVD, with the approval of Mikhail Pankratyev, the Deputy Prosecutor of the USSR, and Lavrenty Beria. Ruzin accused Vavilov of foreign espionage and sabotage.

He was sentenced to death in July 1941. In 1942 his sentence was commuted to twenty years imprisonment. 

In 1943, he died in prison as a result of the harsh conditions. The prison's medical documentation indicates that he had been admitted into the prison hospital a few days prior to his death and mention the diagnoses of lung inflammation, dystrophy and edema as well as general weakness as a complaint, but as for the immediate cause of death, the death certificate only mentions "decline of cardiac activity". Some authors assert that the actual cause of death was starvation. According to Lyubov Brezhneva, he was thrown to his death into a pit of lime in the prison yard.

Personal life
His son Oleg with his first wife Yekaterina Sakharova was born in 1918. That marriage ended in divorce in 1926, after which he married geneticist Elena Ivanovna Barulina, a specialist on lentils and assistant head of the institute's seed collection. Their son Yuri was born in 1928.

Posthumous rehabilitation 
In 1955, Vavilov's life sentence was vacated at a hearing of the Military Collegium of the Supreme Court of the Soviet Union, undertaken as part of a de-Stalinization effort to review Stalin-era death sentences. By the 1960s his reputation was publicly rehabilitated and he began to be hailed as a hero of Soviet science.

Legacy
The Leningrad seedbank was preserved and protected through the 28-month long Siege of Leningrad. While the Soviets had ordered the evacuation of art from the Hermitage Museum, they had not evacuated the 250,000 samples of seeds, roots, and fruits stored in what was then the world's largest seedbank. A group of scientists at the Vavilov Institute boxed up a cross section of seeds, moved them to the basement, and took shifts protecting them. Those guarding the seedbank refused to eat its contents, even though by the end of the siege in the spring of 1944, a number of them had died of starvation.

In 1943, parts of Vavilov's collection, samples stored within the territories occupied by the German armies, mainly in Ukraine and Crimea, were seized by a German unit headed by Heinz Brücher. Many of the samples were transferred to the Schutzstaffel (SS) Institute for Plant Genetics, which had been established at  near Graz, Austria.

The Royal Society of Edinburgh mentions Vavilov in the list of its former fellows, indicating that he died in a Soviet workcamp in Siberia on 26 January 1943. However, he actually died in a Soviet prison in Saratov.

Namesakes 
Today a street in downtown Saratov bears Vavilov's name. Vavilov's monument in Saratov near the end of the Vavilov street was unveiled in 1997. The square near the monument is a common place for opposition rallies. Another monument to him is located near the entrance to the Resurrection cemetery in Saratov, where Vavilov is buried. The USSR Academy of Sciences established the Vavilov Award (1965) and the Vavilov Medal (1968).

Today, the N.I. Vavilov Institute of Plant Industry in St. Petersburg still maintains one of the world's largest collections of plant genetic material. The Institute began as the Bureau of Applied Botany in 1894, and was reorganized in 1924 into the All-Union Research Institute of Applied Botany and New Crops, and in 1930 into the Research Institute of Plant Industry. Vavilov was the head of the institute from 1921 to 1940. In 1968 the institute was renamed after Vavilov in time for its 75th anniversary.

A minor planet, 2862 Vavilov, discovered in 1977 by Soviet astronomer Nikolai Stepanovich Chernykh is named after him and his brother Sergey Ivanovich Vavilov. The crater Vavilov on the far side of the Moon is also named after him and his brother.

Media 
The story of the researchers at the Vavilov Institute during the Siege of Leningrad was fictionalized by novelist Elise Blackwell in her 2003 novel Hunger. That novel was the inspiration for the Decemberists' song "When The War Came" in the 2006 album The Crane Wife, which also depicts the Institute during the siege and mentions Vavilov by name.

In 1987, the Shevchenko National Prize was awarded to Anatoliy Borsyuk (film director), Serhiy Dyachenko (script writer), and Oleksandr Frolov (camera) for the film Star of Vavilov (Russian: "Звезда Вавилова") about Vavilov's work.

In 1990, a six part documentary entitled Nikolai Vavilov (Russian: Николай Вавилов) was created as a joint production of the USSR and East Germany.

Season 1, Episode 4 of the 2020 science documentary series, Cosmos: Possible Worlds starring Neil deGrasse Tyson and based on the original series by Carl Sagan, was titled "Vavilov" and detailed his life.

Works 
Земледельческий Афганистан. (1929)  (Agricultural Afghanistan)
Селекция как наука. (1934) (Breeding as science)
Закон гомологических рядов в наследственной изменчивости. (1935) (The law of homology series in genetical mutability)
Учение о происхождении культурных растений после Дарвина. (1940) (The theory of origins of cultivated plants after Darwin)
Географическая локализация генов пшениц на земном шаре. (1929) (The Geographical Localization of Wheat Genes on the Earth)

Works in English
The Origin, Variation, Immunity and Breeding of Cultivated Plants (translated by K. Starr Chester). 1951. Chronica Botanica 13:1–366, link
Origin and Geography of Cultivated Plants (translated by Doris Löve). 1987. Cambridge University Press, Cambridge. 
Five Continents (translated by Doris Löve). 1997. IPGRI, Rome; VIR, St. Petersburg.

See also
VASKhNIL (the All-Union Academy of Agricultural Sciences of the Soviet Union)
All-Russian Institute of Plant Industry
Vavilovian mimicry
Vavilov Center
Lysenkoism

References

Further reading
 Where Our Food Comes From: Retracing Nikolay Vavilov's Quest to End Famine by Gary Paul Nabhan 2008 

 Kurlovich, B.S. WHAT IS A SPECIES? https://sites.google.com/site/biodiversityoflupins/15-objective-regularities-in-the-variability-of-chatacters/what-is-a-species
 Reznik, S. and Y. Vavilov  1997  "The Russian Scientist Nikolay Vavilov" (preface to English translation of:) Vavilov, N. I. Five Continents.  IPGRI: Rome, Italy.
 Cohen, Barry Mendel  1980  Nikolai Ivanovich Vavilov: His Life and Work. Ph.D.: University of Texas at Austin.
 
Vavilov and his Institute. A history of the world collection of plant genetic resources in Russia, Loskutov, Igor G. 1999. International Plant Genetic Resources Institute, Rome, Italy. 
Louise O. Fresco wrote "De Plantenjager" (2021, The Planthunter, in Dutch), a novel about the research, work and life of professor Vavilov to increase the productivity of the Russian agriculture in the period 1900-1940.

External links 

Vavilov, Centers of Origin, Spread of Crops
Vavilov Center for Plant Industry
Genetic Resources of Leguminous Plants in the N.I. Vavilov Institute of Plant Industry
N. I. Vavilov, The Problem of the Origin of the World's Agriculture in the Light of the Latest Investigations
Speech at the 1939 Conference on Genetics and Selection
Theoretical base of our researches 

1887 births
1943 deaths
Scientists from Moscow
People from Moskovsky Uyezd
All-Russian Central Executive Committee members
Central Executive Committee of the Soviet Union members
Russian atheists
Russian agronomists
Soviet botanists
Soviet agronomists
20th-century Russian botanists
Botanists with author abbreviations
Russian geneticists
Soviet geneticists
Russian geographers
Soviet geographers
Russian explorers
20th-century geographers
Full Members of the USSR Academy of Sciences
Members of the National Academy of Sciences of Ukraine
Academicians of the VASKhNIL
Foreign Members of the Royal Society
Deaths by starvation
Soviet people who died in prison custody
Prisoners who died in Soviet detention
Soviet rehabilitations